This is a list of typefaces used for signage in public areas, such as roads and airports:

See also
Typefaces used on North American traffic signs
Road signs in Australia
Road signs in Belgium
Road signs in Thailand

References

External links
 Download of fonts used on roadsigns

Government typefaces
Technology-related lists
Public Signage Typefaces